Unio gibbus is a species of bivalve belonging to the family Unionidae.

The species is found in the Iberian Peninsula and Morocco.

References

Unionidae